David Jacobson may refer to:

David Jacobson (director), film director
David Jacobson (diplomat) (born 1951), lawyer and diplomat
David Jacobson (fencer), American fencer